Hopelchén (Yucatec Maya: "place of five wells") is a city in the Mexican state of Campeche. It is situated inland in the north of the state. It serves as the municipal seat for the surrounding Hopelchén Municipality. In 2010, Hopelchén had a population of 7,295.

It is also home to a large Mennonite community, of around 50 families as of 2018.

References

Link to tables of population data from Census of 2005 INEGI: Instituto Nacional de Estadística, Geografía e Informática
Hopelchén Official Website of Cityhall

External links
Municipio de Hopelchén from official Campeche state government website 
 Ich-Ek

Populated places in Campeche
Municipality seats in Campeche